Douglas Esteban Sequeira Borbón (born 16 September 2003) is a Costa Rican professional footballer who plays as a defender. He is the son of former Costa Rican international footballer Douglas Sequeira.

Career statistics

Club

Notes

References

2003 births
Living people
Costa Rican footballers
Costa Rica youth international footballers
Association football defenders
Deportivo Saprissa players
Liga FPD players